, formerly known as , is a railway station in the city of Shimada, Shizuoka Prefecture, Japan, operated by the Ōigawa Railway. Its location was formerly the town of Kawane, which was merged into Shimada in 2008.

Lines
Gōkaku Station is on the Ōigawa Main Line and is 5.0 from the terminus of the line at Kanaya Station.

Station layout
The station has a single island platform connected to a rustic wooden station building by a level crossing. The station is unattended.

Adjacent stations

|-
!colspan=5|Ōigawa Railway

Station history
Gokaku Station was one of the original stations of the Ōigawa Main Line and was opened on June 10, 1927 as Goka Station.

Passenger statistics
In fiscal 2017, the station was used by an average of 26 passengers daily (boarding passengers only).

Surrounding area
Japan National Route 473
Goka Elementary School

See also
 List of Railway Stations in Japan

References

External links

 Ōigawa Railway home page

Stations of Ōigawa Railway
Railway stations in Shizuoka Prefecture
Railway stations in Japan opened in 1927
Shimada, Shizuoka